The 1894 South Australian Football Association season was the 18th season of the top-level Australian rules football competition in South Australia.

Ladder 
As Norwood and South Adelaide were level on premiership points, a playoff match for the premiership was required.

Grand final

1894 SAFA Premiership Football Match

1894 SAFA Premiership Football Match Replay

References 

SANFL
South Australian National Football League seasons